Luis Pedro Molina Bruni (born 4 June 1977) is a Guatemalan football goalkeeper. He currently plays for the local club Deportivo Marquense in the Guatemala's top division.

Club career
Molina had been the reserve goalkeeper at Guatemala's top side Comunicaciones behind Edgar Estrada and Danny Ortiz, but moved to Jalapa in 2004 in order to get more playing time. He moved to Marquense in 2009 after Jalapa failed to pay him  and in November 2009 Jalapa were ordered to settle the debt or would lose three points.

International career
He made his debut for the Guatemalan national team in a January 2000 friendly match against Panama and sometimes represented them during the 2006 World Cup qualification campaign. He had earned 15 caps at the start of January 2010.

Also a futsal player, he was part of his country's Futsal team, and played at the 2000 Futsal World Championship which was held in Guatemala.

External links

References

1977 births
Living people
People from Retalhuleu Department
Association football goalkeepers
Guatemalan footballers
Guatemala international footballers
2005 CONCACAF Gold Cup players
2007 UNCAF Nations Cup players
2007 CONCACAF Gold Cup players
2009 UNCAF Nations Cup players
2011 Copa Centroamericana players
2014 Copa Centroamericana players
Comunicaciones F.C. players
Deportivo Marquense players